The James Commodore J4 was a 98 cubic centimeter, two-stroke, motorcycle manufactured by the James Cycle Co and announced in November 1950.  The Commodore was in production from 1951 to 1953.

Engine: Villiers Engineering 1F single-cylinder engine at 98cc 47 mm x 57 mm engine. Carburetor was a Villiers Type 6/0.
Transmission: Two speed with clutch. Handlebar gear lever.
Frame: Single downtube frame.
Suspension: Front was taper tube for girder type with single, central undampened spring. Rear: None
Brakes: 4" front and rear
Drive: Chain and sprocket
Wheels: 21 inches x 2.25 inches

See also
List of motorcycles of the 1950s

External links
James Motorcycles Information Website
James Motorcycle Website - resources and manuals

Commodore
Motorcycles introduced in 1950